Maurer AG, formerly known as Maurer Söhne GmbH & Co. KG, is a steel construction company and roller coaster manufacturer. Founded in 1876 in Munich, Germany, the company has built many styles of steel buildings, ranging from bridges, industrial buildings, and even art structures. While known for building a variety of wild mouse coasters, its subsidiary Maurer Rides GmbH has branched out into spinning, looping, and launching coasters. The company also produces a free-fall tower ride. On December 15, 2014, the company changed its name to Maurer AG.

Roller coaster work

In 1993, Maurer took over the amusement ride division of a fellow German firm, BHS. BHS constructed four Schwarzkopf-designed roller coasters, working with Sansei Yusoki and Zierer in the process. Maurer's first ride was a custom looping roller coaster called Venus GP that opened at Space World in 1996. Since then they have produced almost 50 roller coasters including spinning, launched, racing and wild mouse roller coasters.

One of the first types of roller coaster that Maurer manufactured was a wild mouse. The design, known as Wilde Maus Classic, was first installed as Kopermijn at Drievliet Family Park in 1996. At the end of 2010, the Wilde Maus Classic design has been replicated at 13 locations around the world.

In 2000, the S-Coaster was introduced by Maurer. The S-Coaster is Maurer's spinning roller coaster design. It is the most popular design (in terms of installations) that Maurer has ever produced with over 21 installations worldwide.

Maurer's X-Coaster comes in a variety of different designs: X-Car, X-Train and SkyLoop. Under the X-Car category Maurer manufactures rides with launches, vertical lifts, floorless cars and cars with embedded music systems. An X-Train X-Coaster is one which features 4-across seating (2 seats above the track and one on either side of the track as a floorless seat). Under the SkyLoop category Maurer has a variety of models including XT 150 ( in length), XT 450 ( in length), launched and custom designs.

Most recently, in 2010, Maurer introduced the R-Coaster. The R-Coaster is a type of racing roller coaster which features several sets of Linear Synchronous Motors on two parallel tracks. The first, and currently only, R-Coaster is Fiorano GT Challenge at Ferrari World in Abu Dhabi. In 2018, it was announced that Maurer would be building the first roller coaster at sea, on the Carnival cruise ship Mardi Gras.

List of roller coasters

As of 2022, Maurer AG has built 67 roller coasters around the world.

Maurer German Wheels
Maurer German Wheels is a subsidiary of Maurer Söhne. It manufactures the R80XL giant Ferris wheel under licence from Bussink Design.

References

External links

 

Manufacturing companies based in Munich
Roller coaster manufacturers
 
Manufacturing companies established in 1876
German companies established in 1876